Vasiliy Savelievich Danilov (born 13 May 1941) is a former Russian and Soviet footballer.

Career
He capped 23 times for USSR, playing the 1966 FIFA World Cup.

External links
Profile

1941 births
Living people
Sportspeople from Voronezh Oblast
Russian footballers
Association football defenders
Soviet footballers
Soviet Union international footballers
FC Khimik-Arsenal players
FC Zenit Saint Petersburg players
FC Lokomotiv Moscow players
1966 FIFA World Cup players
FC Dynamo Saint Petersburg players